Abul Kalam Mohammed Zakaria ( – 24 February 2016) was a Bangladeshi scholar and archaeologist. He was awarded Ekushey Padak in 2015 and Bangla Academy Literary Award in 2005 by the Government of Bangladesh for his contribution to research.

Education and career
Zakaria earned his bachelor's in English literature from the University of Dhaka. In 1946, he started his career as a teacher at Azizul Haq College in Bogra. Later, he joined the civil service.

In 1968, Zakaria helped to discover a site containing Sintakote Vihar of the 5th century in Dinajpur.

Zakira retired from the position of Secretary of the Ministry of Culture and Sports in 1976.

Works
Zakaria edited the following books.
 Gupi Chandrer Sonyas
 Gazi Kalu O Champabati
 Bangladesher Nreetotya 
 Comilla Zelar Itihash 
 Tabaqat-i Nasiri

Awards
 Ekushey Padak (2015)
 Bangla Academy Literary Award (2005)
 Asiatic Society Man of the Year Gold Medal
 ROOTS Lifetime Achievement Award 2009

References

1910s births
2016 deaths
People from Brahmanbaria district
University of Dhaka alumni
Bangladeshi archaeologists
Recipients of the Ekushey Padak
Recipients of Bangla Academy Award